Markova Sušica is a village in the Studeničani Municipality, near Skopje, North Macedonia. The village is home to Marko's Monastery.

Demographics
According to the 2002 national census, the village had 53 residents, of which 28 were Turks, 25 Macedonians, 1 Albanian, 2 were Serbs, and 9 others.

Notable people
Sadettin Dilbilgen, philatelist

References

Villages in Studeničani Municipality